Israel Abia (born 10 December 1993) is a Nigerian footballer who plays as a striker for Saudi Second Division club Al-Rawdhah.

After joining Enugu Rangers from Sunshine Stars, Israel Abia was crucial for Enugu Rangers during the 2019–20 season and was the leading goalscorer at the inconclusive 2019–20 NPFL season. On 30 July 2021, Abia joined Saudi Arabian club Al-Rawdhah.

References

External links 
 Israel Abia at Soccerway

1993 births
Living people
Nigerian footballers
Association football forwards
Rangers International F.C. players
Al-Rawdhah Club players
Nigeria Professional Football League players
Saudi Second Division players
Nigerian expatriate sportspeople in Saudi Arabia
Expatriate footballers in Saudi Arabia
Footballers from Enugu